Georgetown is an unincorporated community in Deer Lodge County, Montana, United States. It is located on Pintler Veterans Memorial Scenic Highway, 18 miles from Anaconda.

Nearby are Georgetown Lake and Silver Lake.

Notes

Unincorporated communities in Deer Lodge County, Montana
Unincorporated communities in Montana